Robert Raymond Reid (September 8, 1789 – July 1, 1841) was the fourth territorial governor of Florida. Earlier in his career he was a Representative from Georgia and held several judicial positions.

Robert Reid was born in Prince William Parish, Beaufort District, South Carolina, in 1789. He was educated at the University of South Carolina and studied and practiced law in Augusta, Georgia. Reid began public service at age 27 as a judge and later served Georgia as an at-large Representative from Georgia to the 15th, 16th, and 17th United States Congresses and served from February 18, 1819, to March 3, 1823. He also held several judicial positions including judge in the superior court of Georgia, circuit court judge for Middle Georgia, city judge for Augusta, Georgia. In May 1832, he was appointed United States judge for the district of East Florida by U.S. President Andrew Jackson.

Reid's life was marked by personal tragedy. He married three times, was widowed twice and lost numerous children and grandchildren. With his first wife Anna Margaret McClaws, whom he married in 1811, Reid had five children: Janet, James, Florida, Rosalie, and Robert Raymond III. Anna Margaret McClaws died in 1825. Children Janet and James both drowned in a sailing accident in 1839. His second marriage was to Elizabeth Napier D. Randolph in 1829. She died in childbirth in 1832. In 1836, he married Mary Martha Reid, who later became known for her nursing work during the American Civil War. They had two sons, William and Reymond "Jenks."

U.S. President Martin Van Buren appointed Reid governor of Florida in December 1839. Reid presided at the convention that drafted Florida's first constitution and advocated a vigorous prosecution of the Second Seminole War.

He died at his home in Blackwood near Tallahassee, Florida, on July 1, 1841, a victim of a yellow fever epidemic. His granddaughter Rebecca Black and daughter Janet Black were also victims of the 1841 yellow fever epidemic that struck Florida's Panhandle.

References
Official Governor's portrait and biography from the State of Florida

External links

 Official Governor's portrait and biography from the State of Florida

1789 births
1841 deaths
University of South Carolina alumni
19th-century American politicians
American people of Scottish descent
American slave owners
Governors of Florida Territory
Georgia (U.S. state) state court judges
Georgia (U.S. state) lawyers
People from Beaufort, South Carolina
Politicians from Augusta, Georgia
Deaths from yellow fever
Infectious disease deaths in Florida
Democratic-Republican Party members of the United States House of Representatives from Georgia (U.S. state)
19th-century American judges
19th-century American lawyers